Lakshmi Machine Works Limited is  India's largest textile machinery and CNC Machine Tool manufacturers, based in Coimbatore founded by Dr. G.K. Devarajulu. It started its operation in 1962 in Periyanaickenpalayam in Coimbatore city with technical collaboration with Swiss-based textile machinery manufacturer Rieter for textile machines and German based Steel & Ammunition major Krupp. In mid 1980's the company bought over its Coimbatore based longtime rival and an older Textile & Engineering giant Textool. The company is promoted and owned by the Lakshmi Mills family.

LMW has 60% market share in the domestic Textile Spinning Machinery Industry. LMW diversified into CNC Machine Tools and is a brand leader in manufacturing customized products.

LMW's Global presence has grown over the years, with a market presence not only in developing countries, but also in Europe.

Its Textile Machinery Division was awarded the Confederation of Indian Industry Most Innovative Company of the Year for 2020.

In 2010, LMW - Advanced Technology Centre (ATC) added a new plant to produce components and sub-assemblies for the aerospace industry. ATC facilities include quality assurance aligning to AS9100 D certification, and Nadcap for special process viz chemical process, non-destructive testing, welding and Heat treatment totalling. ATC has engaged projects with major original equipment manufacturers & Tier 1’s in the US, Europe, and various divisions of Hindustan Aeronautics Limited as well as Defence Research and Development Organisation.

References

Sources

 LMW-Rieter Joint Venture Ends
 Textool and LMW Merger
 Lakshmi Machine Works - Company History On The Economic Times Website
 Lakshmi Machine Works - Contact Page

Textile companies of India
Spinning
Textile machinery manufacturers
Companies based in Tamil Nadu
Companies based in Coimbatore
Manufacturing companies established in 1962
Indian brands
Textile industry in Tamil Nadu
Indian companies established in 1962
1962 establishments in Madras State